Vedder is a Dutch and Low German surname. Vedder, related to Dutch  ('father'), meant 'uncle' (father's or mother's brother) in Middle Dutch and Eastern dialects of Dutch. Notable people with the surname include:

 Adam Swart Vedder (1834–1905), New York state born British Columbian politician, son of Volkert
 Amy Vedder (born 1951), American ecologist and primatologist
 Commodore P. Vedder (1838–1910), New York politician
 Eddie Vedder (born 1964), American rock musician, singer, and songwriter
 Edward Bright Vedder (1878–1952), U.S. Army physician, researcher of deficiency diseases, and medical educator
 Elihu Vedder (1836–1923), American painter, book illustrator, and poet
 Harmen Albertse Vedder (1635–1715), Dutch settler in New Netherland, forebear of nearly all Vedders in North America
 Heinrich Vedder (1876–1972), German missionary, linguist, ethnologist, and historian
 Henry Clay Vedder (1853–1935), American Baptist church historian
 Jake Vedder (born 1998), American snowboarder
 Jill Vedder née McCormick (born 1977), American philanthropist, activist and fashion model; wife of Eddie Vedder
 John F. D. Vedder (1789–1863), New York politician
 Lou Vedder (1897–1990), American baseball and football player
 Ria Vedder-Wubben (1951–2016), Dutch politician
 Richard Vedder (born 1940), American economist and college professor
 Shirley Vedder née Matthews (1942–2013), Canadian pop singer
 Yvette Iola Vedder (1928–2010), American actress, pin-up model and singer

See also
 Vedder River, Vedder Mountain, and Vedder Crossing, British Columbia, Canada, named for Volkert Vedder and family from Schenectady, New York, who arrived in the area ca. 1860
 Vedder Sand, geologic formation in California
 Vedder Van Dyck (1889–1960), American Episcopal bishop

References

Dutch-language surnames
Low German surnames